Tıxlı (also, Takyali, Tykh, and Tykhly) is a village and municipality in the Khizi Rayon of Azerbaijan.  It has a population of 546.  The municipality consists of the villages of Tıxlı, Qars, Əngilan, and Təzəkənd.

References 

Populated places in Khizi District